Alfavut (also Romanized as Alfāvūt, Alfāāvot, Alfāūt, Alfāūūt, Alfavet, Alfāvet, and Alfāvot) is a village in Tork-e Gharbi Rural District, Jowkar District, Malayer County, Hamadan Province, Iran. At the 2006 census, its population was 1,334, in 335 families.

References 

Populated places in Malayer County